Edgemont may refer to:

Places

Canada
Edgemont, Calgary, a large suburban neighbourhood in Calgary, Alberta
Edgemont, Edmonton, a neighbourhood in Edmonton, Alberta
Calgary-Edgemont, a federal electoral district in Alberta, Canada

United States
 Edgemont, Arkansas
 Edgemont Shelter (3VB6) Van Buren County, Arkansas; an archaeological site
Edgemont, California (disambiguation), multiple locations
Edgemont, Maryland
Greenville, Westchester County, New York, commonly known as Edgemont
Edgemont Historic District, Rocky Mount, North Carolina, listed on the NRHP in North Carolina
Edgemont (Durham, North Carolina), a textile town established by Julian S. Carr in East Durham, circa 1900 
 Edgemont Historic District, Rocky Mount, Edgecombe County, North Carolina
Edgemont, Pennsylvania, a community in Susquehanna Township, Dauphin County, Pennsylvania, bordering the state capital of Harrisburg
Edgemont, South Dakota

Education
 Edgemont School District (South Dakota), in Edgemont, SD, USA
 Edgemont High School, see Edgemont School District (South Dakota)
 Edgemont Middle School, see Edgemont School District (South Dakota)
 Edgemont Elementary School, see Edgemont School District (South Dakota)
 Edgemont Union Free School District, Westchester, New York State, USA
Edgemont Junior – Senior High School, Greenville, Westchester County, New York state, USA
Edgemont Montessori School, Montclair, New Jersey, USA; see Montclair Public Schools

Facilities and structures
Edgemont Park (disambiguation), several parks
Edgemont (Estes Park, Colorado), listed on the NRHP in Colorado, U.S.
Edgemont (Langhorne, Pennsylvania), U.S., listed on the NRHP
Edgemont (Covesville, Virginia), U.S., listed on the NRHP
Edgemont (Marshall, Texas), listed on the NRHP in Texas, U.S.
Edgemont Church, Christiansburg, Montgomery County, Virginia, U.S.
Edgemont Street station, SEPTA, Pennsylvania, U.S.
Edgemont Village, North Vancouver, British Columbia, Canada; a commercial area

Other uses
Edgemont (TV series), produced by the Canadian Broadcasting Corporation from 2001 until 2005

See also

 
Edgemont Acres, California, USA
Edgemont Ridge, Alberta, Canada
Edgmont (disambiguation)
Edgmond, England, UK